Olivier Fougeroud (born 1965) is a French swimmer. He competed in the men's 4 × 200 metre freestyle relay at the 1988 Summer Olympics.

References

External links
 

1965 births
Living people
Olympic swimmers of France
Swimmers at the 1988 Summer Olympics
Sportspeople from Nice
French male freestyle swimmers